The Weitzenhoffer Family College of Fine Arts is the fine arts unit of the University of Oklahoma in Norman. The college produces nearly 300 concerts, recitals, dramas, musicals, operas and dance performances each year. The college occupies several buildings on campus including the Museum of Art, Rupel J. Jones Fine Arts Center, Donald W. Reynolds Center for the Performing Arts, and Catlett Music Center.

Started in 1924 (the fourth-oldest of OU's colleges), the College was renamed in 2004 for the Weitzenhoffer family (longtime supporters of the College and OU in general).

Academic programs
School of Visual Arts
Art History
Studio Art
School of Dance
Ballet Performance
Ballet Pedagogy
Modern Dance Performance
Helmerich School of Drama
Acting
Dramaturgy
Stage Management
Design
Scenery
Costume
Lighting
Sound
School of Music
Music Education
Music Technology
Musicology
Theory
Brass
Composition
Conducting
Keyboard, including the Pipe Organ
Percussion
Strings
Voice
Woodwinds
Weitzenhoffer School of Musical Theatre

Notes

External links
Weitzenhoffer Family College of Fine Arts

University of Oklahoma
Art schools in Oklahoma
Music schools in Oklahoma
Dance schools in the United States
Performing arts education in the United States
Educational institutions established in 1924
1924 establishments in Oklahoma